The effect of Brexit on Gibraltar concerns the status of Gibraltar after withdrawal of the United Kingdom from the European Union. The UK left the EU on 31 January 2020 after having voted to leave in the 2016 referendum and formally notified the EU of its intention to withdraw in March 2017. Gibraltar is not part of the UK, but unlike all other British Overseas Territories it was a part of the European Union along with the UK. It participated in the Brexit referendum and it ceased, by default, to be a part of the EU upon the UK's withdrawal.

Gibraltar's position during the process of UK withdrawal from the European Union presented specific issues during Brexit negotiations. Gibraltar voted strongly to remain in the European Union during the referendum, and its unique situation presented potential difficulties due to the Spanish claim on Gibraltar, the large contribution of on-line gambling, offshore banking and duty-free shopping to the economy of Gibraltar, and the strong likelihood that Gibraltar would cease to be a part of the single market.

Gibraltar was not covered by the Brexit agreement made in December 2020 and formal negations are taking place to determine its relationship with the EU.

History
Until 2020 Gibraltar was part of the European Union, having joined the European Community (the forerunner to the European Union) through  European Communities Act 1972 (UK), which gave effect to the Treaty of Accession 1972, as a dependent territory of the United Kingdom. It status in the European Union was under what was then article 227(4) of the Treaty Establishing the European Community covering special member state territories, with exemption from some areas such as the European Union Customs Union, Common Agricultural Policy and the Schengen Area. It was the only British Overseas Territory included in the European Union.

Gibraltar's status in EU elections
Gibraltar did not participate in the 1975 UK European Communities membership referendum the result of which had a direct impact on the colony. Neither did it participate in any European Parliamentary Elections between 1979 and 1999, but in 2002 legislation was passed by the British Parliament which allowed Gibraltar to formally take part in the 2004 European Parliament election as part of the South West England constituency in all subsequent European elections. Following the surprise election victory by the Conservatives in May 2015 it was announced that Gibraltar would fully participate in the proposed referendum on continuing EU membership, and this was legislated for in the European Union Referendum Act 2015. Gibraltar was unique in being the only British Overseas Territory within the European Union (EU), and hence was the only such territory with the right to vote in EU elections and the Brexit referendum.

Before the 2016 referendum
In 2015 the Chief Minister of Gibraltar, Fabian Picardo, suggested that Gibraltar would attempt to remain part of the EU in the event the UK voted to leave, but reaffirmed that, regardless of the result, the territory would remain a British overseas territory. In a letter to the UK Foreign Affairs Select Committee, he requested that Gibraltar be considered in negotiations post-Brexit.

Before the referendum, José García-Margallo, the Spanish minister of foreign affairs at the time, stated that in the event of Brexit, Gibraltar would not have access to the single market unless a formula giving Spain co-sovereignty were agreed for a transitional period. After the referendum, he saw the result as increasing the chance of a Spanish flag on Gibraltar.  He also said Spain would seek talks on Gibraltar, whose status is disputed, the "very next day" after a British exit from the EU.

Referendum

The European Union (Referendum) Act 2016 (Gibraltar), was passed by the Gibraltar Parliament and implemented in Gibraltar after the European Union Referendum Act 2015 was passed by the UK Parliament.

During the campaign leading up to the United Kingdom's national referendum on whether to leave the European Union (known as "Brexit") the Spanish government warned that if the UK chose to leave, Spain would push to reclaim control over Gibraltar. The Chief Minister of Gibraltar, Fabian Picardo, warned the UK of the threat to Gibraltar's safety posed by Brexit. All three parties represented in the legislature supported remaining in the EU during the referendum and the Remain campaign was known as Gibraltar Stronger in Europe.

The referendum result within Gibraltar was declared early on Friday 24 June 2016 by the counting officer and Clerk to the Gibraltar Parliament Paul Martinez at the University of Gibraltar at 0040 CEST making it the first of the 382 voting areas to declare and its result was fed into the South West England regional count and then the overall national count. The result saw 95.9% of Gibraltarian voters opting to remain, on a turnout of 84%. Overall the United Kingdom voted by 51.9% to 48.1% to leave the European Union.

Gibraltar in the Brexit negotiations
Gibraltar had no direct say in the negotiations between the UK and the 27 remaining countries of the European Union (EU27), since the duty and responsibility of dealing with foreign affairs rests with the UK, as do the duties of defence and internal security in Gibraltar.

Robin Walker MP, Parliamentary Under-Secretary of State for Department for Exiting the European Union, visited Gibraltar in March 2017 to discuss Brexit with Fabian Picardo (Chief Minister of Gibraltar) and Joseph Garcia (Deputy Chief Minister of Gibraltar).

With the impending Brexit negotiations, the House of Lords produced a report entitled "Brexit: Gibraltar".

The European Council released a series of guidelines for the EU27 on negotiations for withdrawal. Within these guidelines, core principle number 22 stated that "After the United Kingdom leaves the Union, no agreement between the EU and the United Kingdom may apply to the territory of Gibraltar without the agreement between the Kingdom of Spain and the United Kingdom". Pro-Brexit Conservative MP Jack Lopresti thought it shameful that the EU would attempt to allow Spain an effective veto over the future of British sovereign territory, ignoring the will of the people of Gibraltar. Foreign secretary Boris Johnson re-iterated the United Kingdom's commitment to Gibraltar.

Esteban González Pons, a Spanish MEP and chairman of the Brexit working group of the European People's Party, met with Ireland's Minister for European affairs Dara Murphy in May, when he (Pons) called Gibraltar a "colony" and pushed for support for the Spanish position that the status of Gibraltar is a bilateral issue solely for the UK and Spain to resolve. Ireland recognised that the issue was a bilateral one but wished to avoid parallels being drawn with the status of Northern Ireland. Murphy stated that "Ireland will address issues regarding the nature of the relationship of Gibraltar with the European Union post-Brexit as and when they arise in the course of negotiations on the future relationship of the UK with the European Union."

In April 2017, the former director of operational capability at the UK Ministry of Defence, Rear Admiral Chris Parry, said, "We could cripple Spain in the medium term and I think the Americans would probably support us too" if it came to war over Gibraltar, though he did not believe that war was likely.

Key issues

Sovereignty

The day after the result, Spain's acting Foreign Minister, José Manuel García-Margallo, renewed calls for joint Spanish–British control of the peninsula.  These calls were strongly rebuffed by Gibraltar's Chief Minister.  After the result Spain reiterated its position that it wanted to jointly govern Gibraltar with the United Kingdom and said it would seek to block Gibraltar from participating in talks over future deals between the UK and EU.

In April 2017, British Prime Minister Theresa May reiterated that "the UK would seek the best possible deal for Gibraltar as the UK exits the EU, and there would be no negotiation on the sovereignty of Gibraltar without the consent of its people.” 

In April 2018, Spanish Foreign Minister Alfonso Dastis announced that Spain hoped to sign off a bilateral agreement with Britain over Gibraltar before October so as not to hinder a Brexit transition deal. Talks between London and Madrid had progressed well. While reiterating the Spanish long-term aim of "recovering" Gibraltar, he said that Spain would not hold Gibraltar as a "hostage" to the EU negotiations.

Movement over the border
Questions were raised over the future of free-flowing traffic at the Gibraltar–Spain border.

People
Gibraltar, like the UK, had been outside the Schengen Area. All people crossing the border to/from Spain have therefore always been required to go through British and Spanish border controls. There are estimates that upwards of 15,000 people live in La Línea, in Spain but work in Gibraltar. (La Línea has an unemployment rate of 35% whereas Gibraltar has a 1% unemployment rate.)

Goods
Gibraltar was never part of the EU's customs union, so there were already more detailed checks on goods moving over the Spanish-Gibraltar border.

Air travel
In 2017 a Spanish diplomat indicated that any agreement on airline landing rights for flights between the EU and the UK agreed during Brexit negotiations would not apply to the Gibraltar International Airport. Most of the international flights using Gibraltar airport are to the UK or Morocco. There were some flights to Spanish destinations following the Cordoba Agreement, 2006, but there were none by the time of Brexit. There are no airports in mainland Spain within  of Gibraltar.

Finance industry
Anticipating a loss of access to EU markets as a result of Brexit, the Government of Gibraltar received "a firm commitment from the United Kingdom government to maintain and broaden access to their financial markets," including "automatic access to the United Kingdom in banking, insurance, investment services and any other similar area where cross-border directives currently apply".

Fintech companies like Payoneer moved their offices from Gibraltar to Ireland, the main English-speaking country left in the EU, as a result of the Brexit.

On 4 March 2019, the UK and Spain signed an agreement of taxation pertaining to Gibraltar. This was the first treaty in 300 years that explicitly referred to Gibraltar. The agreement came into force on 4 March 2021 and established enhanced cooperation between Spain and the British Overseas Territory. Under the agreement Gibraltar provides Spain with regular information on those Spanish workers and assets that are registered in Gibraltar. The agreement also makes it more difficult for Spanish fiscal residents to register themselves in Gibraltar. A direct effect of this agreement was Spain taking Gibraltar off its list of tax havens.

Brexit Agreement
On 18 October 2018, the Spanish Prime Minister, Pedro Sánchez, announced that he had reached an agreement with Britain, declaring the Gibraltar protocol "resolved". He stated that the Spanish government would hold no objection to the United Kingdom leaving the EU as regards the situation of Gibraltar being a British Overseas Territory which was then within the EU. It was also agreed that any dispute which Spain had or may have over the sovereignty of Gibraltar would not affect any future trade agreement between Britain and the EU.

On 22 November 2018, Pedro Sánchez threatened that Spain would veto Brexit if Spanish concerns over Gibraltar were not addressed. Two days later, on Saturday 24 November, British EU Ambassador Sir Tim Barrow, assured the Spanish leadership that no future trade deals around Brexit would relate to Gibraltar's market, which cleared the way for the Brexit deal to pass. The deal, agreed in November 2018, covered Gibraltar and the territory was also included in transitional arrangements which lasted until the end of 2020. However, post transition-period agreements remained to be negotiated between the stakeholders.

Post-Brexit treaty negotiations
Brexit arrangements agreed between the UK and EU on 24 December 2020 did not cover Gibraltar. An agreement reached on 31 December 2020 allowed Gibraltar to join the Schengen Area in principle, but a treaty on the matter remained to be agreed. Spain's foreign minister, Arancha González Laya said that she anticipated that it would take about six months to negotiate and conclude a treaty but that in the meantime Spain would work to ensure that mobility at the border would be "as fluid as possible". On 31 December 2020 both Spain and the UK Government wrote to the President of the European Commission asking them to seek a mandate to create a treaty concerning movement of labour and goods, the environment, citizens rights, continued recognition of documents etc. An agreement was reached on the creation of a special committee to handle Gibraltar–EU matters, such as free movement for people and border controls, containing only representatives from Spain and the UK.

Movement over the border

On 31 December 2020, Spain and the United Kingdom reached an agreement in principle under which Gibraltar would join the European Union's Schengen Area. This cleared the way for the European Union and the UK to start formal negotiations on the matter. Elements of the proposed agreement are:
Gibraltar (air)ports become entry points of the Schengen area, under responsibility of Spain 
The border controls will be performed by Frontex-personnel 
unrestricted movement of goods
arrangements in the field of "environment, the level playing field, social security coordination, citizens’ rights, data and matters related to continued document recognition" 
the relationship between Gibraltar and the European Union in areas of EU competence
Gibraltar can offer residence permit on its own decision
Visa for visiting Gibraltar will be Schengen visas and the visa waiver ETIAS 
The arrangements are implemented for "an initial period of four years"

Since Gibraltar left the EU, ad hoc arrangements have been in place. Spain has granted free border passage to workers and tourists to avoid disruption, and other pragmatic cross-border bridging measures have also been applied. The expected six month timetable was not followed, but on 20 July 2021 the EU commission proposed a mandate with directives for the negotiations. Formal negotiations needed the Council of the European Union to adopt the mandate in order to proceed, and in October 2021 the Council approved the mandate allowing negotiations to begin anticipating an agreement on Gibraltar.

Formal negotiation period 

Negotiations started soon after and focussed on the future status of the border. No formal agreement had been reached by December 2021, and so several temporary bridging measures for mutual recognition were introduced with respect to driving licences and healthcare between Spain and Gibraltar. The negotiations continued through the winter of 2021–22 and there were hopes that they would finish during the spring as the objective was to conclude an agreement before Easter. However, negotiations continued throughout the summer of 2022 and proceeded slowly, partly due to the British government crisis that took place at the time, and uncertainty remained about the timetable. The reciprocal health care agreement that had been extended until 30 June 2022 came to an end. As a result it became necessary for residents of Gibraltar to purchase travel insurance in order to receive low cost emergency health care in Spain. By the end of 2022, negotiations appeared to be deadlocked over the policing of passport control at Gibraltar airport. Concerns about the possible election of a Spanish government in 2023 that could be less sympathetic to Gibraltar's aspirations led to renewed discussion of the possible consequences of the failure of the treaty talks. This could be a continuation of the status quo or a more isolated Gibraltar hoping to benefit from low taxes and low regulation.

References

Consequences of Brexit
Gibraltar and the European Union